The 1981 Major League Baseball All-Star Game was the 52nd playing of the midsummer classic between the all-stars of the American League (AL) and National League (NL), the two leagues comprising Major League Baseball. The game was held on Sunday, August 9, 1981, at Cleveland Stadium in Cleveland, Ohio, the home of the Cleveland Indians of the American League.  As of 2020, it is the only MLB All-Star Game that was played on a Sunday.

This was one of only two All-Star Games to be played outside the month of July (the other being the second 1959 game). The game was originally to be played on Tuesday, July 14, but was cancelled due to the players' strike lasting from June 12 to July 31. It was then brought back as a prelude to the second half of the season, which began the following day. At 72,086 people in attendance, it broke the stadium's own record of 69,751 set in 1954, setting the still-standing record for the highest attendance in an All Star Game.

Cleveland Stadium set a new All-Star Game record by hosting its fourth (and ultimately, final) Midsummer Classic.  By the time Indians played host to the All-Star Game for the fifth time in 1997, they had moved to Jacobs Field, and the sixth time in 2019 was at Progressive Field (formerly known as Jacobs Field).

Rosters
Players in italics have since been inducted into the National Baseball Hall of Fame.

National League

American League

Game

Umpires

Starting lineups

Game summary

The American League started with four shutout innings, two apiece by starter Jack Morris and Len Barker.  Meanwhile, Fernando Valenzuela, only the second rookie pitcher to start an All-Star Game, pitched a scoreless first with two strikeouts.  The AL got on the board in the second when Ken Singleton homered off Tom Seaver.

Gary Carter broke the scoring drought for the NL and tied the game with a shot off Ken Forsch in the fifth. Dave Parker gave the senior circuit the lead with a homer in the sixth off Mike Norris.

Burt Hooton came in for the NL in the AL-half of the sixth and promptly loaded the bases on three successive singles by Singleton, Dwight Evans, and Carlton Fisk. Fred Lynn lined another single, but only Singleton came home to tie it at 2-2. Buddy Bell followed with a sacrifice fly to give the AL a 3-2 lead. Eddie Murray then bounced what looked to be a double-play grounder to Steve Garvey at first, but Garvey's low throw combined with a great play by Ozzie Smith at second and a rolling slide by Lynn resulted in only a force at second.  Fisk went to third and Ted Simmons singled him in to make it 4-2. Al Oliver then lifted a bloop fly ball to left that looked like it would drop, but Dusty Baker hustled in and made a sliding catch for the third out, saving a run and possibly more.

In the seventh, Carter got one of the runs back with his second homer, this one off Ron Davis.  Then, in the eighth, Rollie Fingers walked Ozzie Smith.  Smith stole second and attempted to take third when Bo Díaz' throw went into center field. Dave Winfield hustled the ball back to the infield and Smith was caught in a rundown and tagged out by Fingers. Mike Easler walked and Mike Schmidt homered off Fingers to give the National League their winning runs.

Footnotes and references

External links
Baseball-Reference.com
Baseball Almanac

Major League Baseball All-Star Game
Major League Baseball All-Star Game
Baseball competitions in Cleveland
August 1981 sports events in the United States
1980s in Cleveland
1981 in sports in Ohio